Olga Kefalogianni (born 29 April 1975 in Athens) is a Greek politician who served as Minister of Tourism of the Greek Government from 2012 to 2015. She was appointed in this position by Prime Minister Antonis Samaras in June 2012. She is a Member of Parliament, representing the New Democracy party. She has been elected two times in the Cretan prefecture of Rethymno in the 2007 and 2009 general elections. In the 6 May 2012 elections, she was voted in the first position as Member of Parliament for the important District A of Athens constituency. She was re-elected in the same position in the 17 June 2012 elections, and again in January 2015. She is the daughter of former minister and member of parliament, the late Ioannis Kefalogiannis. She was married to Greek businessman Manos Pentheroudakis from 2010 to 2020. On May 3rd 2021 she married composer Minos Matsas in Spetses. On May 8th she announced that she is pregnant with twins.

She obtained a bachelor's degree in law from the National and Kapodistrian University of Athens in 1997. She holds a Master of Laws degree (LLM) in commercial and business law from King's College London (1998). In 2006 she earned a second master's degree in international affairs from The Fletcher School of Law and Diplomacy at Tufts University.

She has written a book titled  "The role of the European Union on the Cyprus issue".

References

External links
 

1975 births
Alumni of King's College London
Greek MPs 2007–2009
Greek MPs 2009–2012
Greek MPs 2012 (May)
Greek MPs 2012–2014
Greek MPs 2015 (February–August)
Greek MPs 2015–2019
Living people
Ministers of Tourism of Greece
National and Kapodistrian University of Athens alumni
New Democracy (Greece) politicians
Politicians from Athens
The Fletcher School at Tufts University alumni
Women government ministers of Greece
21st-century Greek women politicians
Greek MPs 2019–2023